Takalay is a rural locality (a selo) in Khalimbekaulsky Selsoviet, Buynaksky District, Republic of Dagestan, Russia. The population was 415 as of 2010. There are 2 streets.

Geography 
Takalay is located 11 km southeast of Buynaksk (the district's administrative centre) by road, on the Shuraozen River. Khalimbekaul and Kafyr-Kumukh are the nearest rural localities.

References 

Rural localities in Buynaksky District